John Wylie P. Breckenridge (22 April 1903 – c. 1991) was a rugby union player who represented Australia.

Breckenridge, a flanker, was born in Failford, New South Wales and claimed a total of 11 international rugby caps for Australia. In October 2014 Breckenridge was inducted into Australia Rugby's Hall of Fame.

References

Australian rugby union players
Australia international rugby union players
1903 births
1991 deaths
Rugby union flankers
Rugby union players from New South Wales